Lanman may refer to:

 LAN Manager, an obsolete authentication protocol for Microsoft Windows
 LAN Manager hash, the hashing algorithm used by LAN Manager
Lanman (surname)
 Lanman-Wright Hall at Yale, named after William K. Lanman